Fretheim is a surname. Notable people with the surname include:

Terence E. Fretheim, American Old Testament scholar
Thorstein Fretheim (1886–1971), Norwegian politician
Thorsten Guttormsen Fretheim (1808–1874), Norwegian politician
Tor Fretheim (1946–2018), Norwegian journalist and author of children's literature